The history of the Jews in Cyprus dates back at least to the 2nd century BC, when a considerable number of Jews in Cyprus was first recorded. The Jews had close relationships with many of the other religious groups on the island and were seen favourably by the island's Roman rulers. During the war over the city of Ptolemais between Alexander Jannaeus and King Lathyros, many Jews remained committed to King Lathyros and were subsequently killed.

Jewish rebellions and Byzantine rule 
The Jews lived well in Cyprus during Roman rule. Christianity was preached to the Jews in Cyprus at an early date, with St Paul being the first and the Apostle Barnabas (a native of Cyprus) the second. They attempted to convert the Jews to Christianity. Aristobulus of Britannia, the first bishop of Britain, was the brother of Barnabas.

Cypriot Jews participated in the Kitos War against the Romans and their leader Trajan in 117 CE under the leadership of Artemion. They sacked Salamis and annihilated the Greek population. According to Roman historian Cassius Dio, the revolting party massacred 240,000 Greek-Cypriots. Cassius Dio also reported that Jews were not allowed to settle on Cyprus after the uprising was put down. The law was applied so strictly in the centuries that followed that any Jew who wrecked his ship off the coast of Cyprus was executed right away. Jewish settlement in Cyprus appears to have completely halted until the fourth century CE.

According to a late source, written by Eutychius of Alexandria, Cypriot Jews attacked Christian monasteries on the island during the reign of Heraclius (610-641).

Twice in 649 and 653, when the population was overwhelmingly Christian, Cyprus was subjected to two raids by Arab forces which resulted in the capture and enslavement of many Cypriots. One story relates that an enslaved Jew in Syria managed to escape and seek sanctuary in Cyprus, where he converted and settled in Amathus in the late 7th century. Communities of the Greek-speaking Romaniote Jews from the Byzantine period have been documented.

Latin Era (11911571) 
In 1110 CE, Jews were engaged in tax collecting on the island. Benjamin of Tudela reported that there were three distinct Jewish communities in Cyprus in 1163: Karaites, Rabbanites, and the heretical Epikursin, who observed Shabbat on Saturday evenings. King Peter I enticed Egyptian Jewish traders to come to Cyprus by promising equal treatment for Jews. The Genoese (13731463) stole Jewish property in both Famagusta and Nicosia. In the 16th century, about 2,000 Jews were reported to have been living in Famagusta. When a rumour reached Venice that Joseph Nassi was plotting to betray the Famagusta fortress to the Ottomans, investigations failed to ascertain the veracity of the report; however, as a counter-measure, the Venetian authorities decided to expel all non-native Jews from the island while leaving the Famagusta community intact.

Ottoman Era (15711878) 

Cyprus was conquered by the Ottoman Empire after their war with Venice. During Ottoman rule, the Jewish community of Cyprus thrived due to the influx of Sephardi Jews from Ottoman lands, who had emigrated to the Ottoman territories after their expulsion from Spain in 1492. Famagusta became the main centre of the Ottoman Jewish community in Cyprus. Ottoman rule lasted until 1878, when Cyprus came under British rule.

Modern history 
During the last 20 years of the 19th century, several attempts were made to settle Russian and Romanian Jewish refugees in Cyprus. The first attempt in 1883 was a settlement of several hundred Russians established in Orides, near Paphos. In 1885, 27 Romanian families settled on the island as colonists but were not successful in forming communities. Romanian Jews in 1891 again bought land in Cyprus, though they did not move to the country.

Under the leadership of Walter Cohen, 15 Russian families founded a colony in Margo in 1897, with the help of the Ahawat Zion of London and the Jewish Colonisation Association. In 1899, Davis Trietsch, a delegate to the Third Zionist Congress at Basel, attempted to get an endorsement for Jewish colonisation in Cyprus, especially for Romanian Jews. Although his proposal was refused by the council, Trietsch persisted, convincing two dozen Romanian Jews to immigrate to the land. 28 Romanian families followed these and received assistance from the Jewish Colonization Association. These settlers established farms in Margo and Asheriton. The Jewish Colonisation Association continued to give some support to Jewish workers in Cyprus. Most Jewish communities between 1900 and 1910 were located in Nicosia. In 1901, the Jewish population of the island was 63 men and 56 women. In 1902, Theodor Herzl presented in a pamphlet to the Parliamentary committee on alien immigration in London, bearing the title: "The Problem of Jewish Immigration to England and the United States Solved by Furthering the Jewish Colonisation of Cyprus."

During World War II and the Holocaust, Cyprus played a major role for European Jews. After the rise of Nazi Germany in 1933, hundreds of Jews escaped to the island. Following the liquidation of the concentration camps of Europe, the British set up a detention camp in Cyprus for Holocaust survivors illegally trying to enter Palestine. From 1946 until the establishment of the nearby State of Israel in 1948, the British confined 50,000 Jewish refugees in Cyprus. Once the State of Israel was created, most of the Jewish community moved there. About 2,000 children were born in Cyprus as families waited to enter Israel. In 2014, a "Garden of Peace" was opened in Xylotymbou to commemorate the plight of the thousands of Jewish refugees imprisoned in the British camps.

Today 

Israel has had diplomatic relations with Cyprus since the State of Israel's founding in 1948, when Cyprus was still a British protectorate. Israel and Cyprus' associations have continued to expand since 1960, the year of Cyprus' independence from Britain. Cyprus has remained a friend of Israel throughout the conflicts of recent decades, despite incidents such as side effects of Turkey and Israel co-operating in military operations, Israeli Air Force members violating Cyprus' airspace, and suspicions that Israel had been passing intelligence to Turkey regarding Cyprus' defense systems. Today, the diplomatic relations between Cyprus and Israel are at an all-time high, reflecting common geopolitical strategies regarding Turkey in particular and economic interests in developing off-shore gas reserves.

Rabbi Arie Zeev Raskin originally arrived in Cyprus from Israel in 2003 as an emissary of Chabad-Lubavitch. He was sent to the island to help stimulate a Jewish revival. On 12 September 2005, he was formally nominated as the official Rabbi of Cyprus in a ceremony attended by guests such as Rabbi Moshe Kotlarsky, the Vice Chairman of the Lubavitch educational division at Lubavitch World Headquarters, the Cypriot Education and Culture minister, and Larnaca's deputy mayor Alexis Michaelides. Other guests included members of the Cypriot government, politicians, diplomats, and other prominent members of the local community.

Also in 2005, the local Jewish community inaugurated the island's first synagogue (Larnaca Synagogue), a mikveh, a Jewish cemetery, and started a Jewish learning program in Larnaca. Since a Cypriot wine is mentioned in the Torah as a necessary ingredient for the holy incense, the community began overseeing the production of a kosher wine (made of a Cabernet Sauvignon-Grenach Noir blend) at the Lambouri winery in Kato Platres in 2008. As of 2016, the Jewish community of Cyprus has opened Jewish centres in Larnaca, Nicosia, Lemesos, and Ayia Napa, offering educational programs for adults, a kindergarten, and a day school. The Rabbinate is planning to establish a new larger community centre with a museum about the History of the Jews in Cyprus and a library.

In 2011, Archbishop Chrysostomos II of Cyprus met with the Chief Rabbi of Israel and signed a declaration affirming the illegitimacy of the doctrine of collective Jewish guilt for the killing of Jesus, repudiating the idea as a prejudice that is "incompatible with the teaching of the Holy scriptures".

In 2018, the Jewish population of Cyprus was estimated at around 6,500.

See also  
Cyprus–Israel relations
History of Cyprus
Larnaca Synagogue
History of the Jews in Greece

Romaniote Jews
Hellenistic Judaism
History of the Jews in the Byzantine Empire
Greek Citron

Bibliography 
 Stavros Pantelis, Place of Refuge: A History of the Jews in Cyprus, 2004
 Pieter W. Van der Horst, The Jews of ancient Cyprus in Zutot: Perspectives on Jewish culture Vol. 3, 2004 pp. 110–120
 Gad Freudenthal, Science in medieval Jewish cultures pp. 441-ff. about Cyprus, 2011
 Yitzchak Kerem, "The Jewish and Greek Historical Convivencia in Cyprus; Myth and Reality", Association of European Ideas, Nicosia, Cyprus, 2012
 Benjamin Arbel, "The Jews in Cyprus: New Evidence from the Venetian Period", Jewish Social Studies, 41 (1979), pp. 23–40, reprinted in: Cyprus, the Franks and Venice (Aldershot, 2000).
 Noy, D. et al. Inscriptiones Judaicae Orientis: Vol. III Syria and Cyprus, 2004
 Refenberg, A. A. Das Antike Zyprische Judentum und Seine Beziehungen zu Palästina, Journal of The Palestine Oriental Society, 12 (1932) 209-215 
 Nicolaou Konnari, M. and Schabel, C. Cyprus: Society And Culture 1191–1374, pp. 162-ff. 2005
 Falk, A. A Psychoanalytic History of the Jews, p. 315. 1996
 Stillman, N. A. The Jews of Arab Lands, pp. 295-ff. 1979
 Jennings, R. Christians and Muslims in Ottoman Cyprus and the Mediterranean World, 1571–1640, pp. 221-ff. 1993
 Kohen, E. History of the Turkish Jews and Sephardim: Memories of a Past Golden Age, pp. 94–99 on Cyprus. 2007
 Lewis, B. The Jews of Islam, pp. 120-ff. 2014

References

External links 
The Jewish Virtual Library
http://www.marycy.org/cyprus.html
http://www.eretz.com/NEW/article/Cyprus%20jews.pdf
Rabbinate of Cyprus (chiefly in Hebrew and English)
Chabad of Cyprus
Bibliography on the Jews of Cyprus (chiefly in Hebrew and English)

 
Hellenistic Judaism
Romaniote Jews topics